The Rural Municipality of Excel No. 71 is a rural municipality (RM) in the Canadian province of Saskatchewan within Census Division No. 3 and  Division No. 2. It is located in the south-central portion of the province.

History 
The RM of Excel No. 71 incorporated as a rural municipality on January 1, 1913.

Geography

Communities and localities 
The following unincorporated communities are within the RM.

Organized hamlets
Ormiston

Localities
Crane Valley
Maxwellton
Readlyn, dissolved as a village, December 31, 1955
Verwood, dissolved as a village, December 31, 1954
Viceroy, dissolved as a village, May 10, 2002

Dryboro/ Burn Lake IBA 
Dryboro/ Burn Lake (SK 029) is an Important Bird Area (IBA) of Canada within the RM of Excel. Dryboro and Burn Lakes are part of a larger complex of connected intermittent salt lakes in a semi-arid landscape surrounded by hilly terrain that is part of a federal Prairie Farm Rehabilitation Administration. The lakes are an important habitat for the endangered piping plover and are protected from development up to the high water mark. Other birds found in the area include the Baird's sparrow, Sprague's pipit, chestnut-collared longspur, clay-coloured sparrow, and the horned lark.

Demographics 

Government 
The RM of Excel No. 71 is governed by an elected municipal council and an appointed administrator that meets on the first Tuesday of every month. The reeve of the RM is Arnold Montgomery while its administrator is Jan McDonald. The RM's office is located in Viceroy.

Transportation  
The Red Coat & Rail Ltd. operates a short-line railway through the rural municipality. It is primarily used for the transport of agricultural products.

References 

E

Division No. 3, Saskatchewan
Important Bird Areas of Saskatchewan